Assel is a hamlet in the municipality of Apeldoorn in the Netherlands, located close to the village of Hoog Soeren.

It was first mentioned in 814 or 815 as Hasle. The etymology is unclear. It is not a statistical entity, and the postal authorities have placed it under Hoog Soeren. It consists of about 10 houses.

Gallery

References 

Populated places in Gelderland
Apeldoorn